Crisfield Municipal Airport  is a public airport located  from Crisfield in Somerset County, Maryland, United States. Crisfield is located near the center of the Delmarva Peninsula in the heart of Bay Country. The Crisfield-Somerset County Airport is a joint venture of Somerset County and the City of Crisfield.  

The airport averages 33 flights per week and has nine aircraft based at the field.

References

External links 
Crisfield Airport website

Airports in Maryland
Crisfield, Maryland
Transportation buildings and structures in Somerset County, Maryland